Jamie O'Loughlin is an Australian professional basketball coach.

Coaching career
O'Loughlin's coaching career started in 1999, when he was the Club Director of Coaching for Geelong's Christian College, whilst also serving as the head coach of the U12 Boys team with Basketball Geelong.

After coaching the Basketball Geelong U12 and U16 Boys teams for multiple years, in 2003 O'Loughlin was promoted to coaching the U18 team. In the same year he also took teams from Christian College  to multiple championships, including the Hooptime Championships, the Victorian College Championships, and the Australian Schools Championships.

In April 2006 O'Loughlin joined the Geelong Supercats as an assistant coach, and helped guide the team to three consecutive championships in the South East Australian Basketball League (SEABL). In October 2009 he was promoted to head coach, and won the SEABL again in 2010.

Between 2009 and 2011 O'Loughlin ran team camps for the Australia national under-17 basketball team, and in 2011 he coached the under-16 team at the 2011 FIBA Oceania Under-16 Championship. After leading the team to the Gold Medal, he rejoined the under-17 team and traveled to the 2012 FIBA Under-17 World Championship with them, where they reached the Silver Medal. O'Loughlin continued coaching both the under-16 and under-17 teams until 2014, during which he won another Gold Medal (with the under-16 team) and another Silver Medal (with the under-17 team).

After his success in Geelong and with the junior national teams, O'Loughlin moved to Perth in 2014 and joined the Perth Wildcats of the NBL as an assistant coach. During his time coaching the Wildcats he helped them reach the semi-finals during the 2014–15 season, and win the championship during the 2015–16 and 2016–17 seasons.

O'Loughlin moved to Cairns in 2017 and joined rival NBL club the Cairns Taipans as the second assistant coach, stating the reason was that he "couldn't pass on the chance to work with" head coach Aaron Fearne. "He's been highly successful for a long time and runs a program that other basketball organisations aspire to. It's no secret he coaches at a high level and I know I'll learn a lot from him."

After his first season with the Taipans, O'Loughlin joined the club's QBL feeder team, the Cairns Marlins as the head coach in 2018, and guided the club to the grand finals against the Townsville Heat. The Marlins lost both games of the series.

In 2018 the Taipans made multiple coaching changes, during which O'Loughlin was the only coach to remain at the club over the off season. Despite being a potential replacement for outgoing head coach Aaron Fearne, Mike Kelly was chosen as the new head coach and O'Loughlin was promoted to the first assistant coach position instead.

O'Loughlin was named as an assistant coach in the UniSport Australia Emerging Boomers squad in 2019, and traveled to Napoli, Italy to compete in the 2019 Summer Universiade. He joined head coach Rob Beveridge and helped the team finish the games with a bronze medal.

O'Loughlin took over as head coach of the Mandurah Magic men's team in May 2022.

References

Living people
Australian men's basketball coaches
Sportspeople from Geelong
Year of birth missing (living people)